Amyipunga moritzii is a species of beetle in the family Cerambycidae. It was described by Thomson in 1860.

References

Clytini
Beetles described in 1860
Taxa named by James Thomson